Van Loo is a Dutch toponymic surname, meaning "from the forest clearing". People with this surname include:
A family of painters 

Jacob van Loo (1614–1670), Dutch painter
Louis-Abraham van Loo (1653-1712), Dutch-born French painter, son of Jacob
Jean-Baptiste van Loo (1684–1745), French painter, son of Louis-Abraham
Charles-André van Loo (1705–1765), French painter, brother of Jean-Baptiste
Louis-Michel van Loo (1707–1771), French painter, son of Jean-Baptiste
Charles-Amédée-Philippe van Loo (1719–1795), French painter, son of Jean-Baptiste
Others 
Albert Vanloo (1841–1920), Belgian librettist and playwright
Anthony Van Loo (born 1988), Belgian footballer
Brian van Loo (born 1975), Dutch football goalkeeper
Christine Van Loo, American aerialist and acrobat
Leon Van Loo (1841–1907), Belgian-born American photographer and art promoter

Dutch-language surnames
Surnames of Dutch origin